The University of Illinois College of Law (Illinois Law or UIUC Law) is the law school of the University of Illinois Urbana-Champaign, a public university in Champaign, Illinois. It was established in 1897 and offers the J.D., LL.M., and J.S.D. degrees.

History
The College of Law was founded in 1897 and is a charter member of the Association of American Law Schools. The law honor society known as the Order of the Coif was founded at the University of Illinois College of Law in 1902.

University of Illinois College of Law is on the south end of the main University of Illinois campus in Champaign, near Memorial Stadium (Champaign) and the State Farm Center.

The University of Illinois College of Law has the 14th largest law library in the United States of America, and the college has several notable alumni in law firms, politics, the judiciary, and academia, including: Albert E. Jenner Jr., name partner at the law firm Jenner & Block, Annette Lu, Vice President of the Republic of China from 2000 to 2008, and Philip McConnaughay, current dean of Peking University School of Transnational Law and former dean of Penn State Dickinson Law.

Investigation into manipulation of admissions data
On September 11, 2011, The News-Gazette reported that the University of Illinois College of Law posted inaccurate information on its website about the LSAT scores and GPAs of its incoming first-year law students. The school removed the inaccurate information and placed an assistant dean on administrative leave. On September 19, 2011, the University of Illinois College of Law posted the corrected information on its website. The actual LSAT and GPA medians for the class of 2014 were 163 and 3.70, respectively. Two months later, the law school announced that a report commissioned from Jones Day and Duff & Phelps had found admission data for six of the seven previous years to have been manipulated by the assistant dean of Admissions Paul Pless, and that Pless had acted alone and would no longer work for the College.

Academics

The College of Law offers the Juris Doctor (J.D.), the professional degree in law, as well as the Master of Laws (LL.M) and Doctor of Juridical Science (J.S.D.), academic graduate degrees in law.

A program that had been started with the American Bar Association in 2009 to permit certain UIUC undergraduates to enter without an LSAT was shut down in 2012 as part of the penalty for the college's falsification of admission data.

The flagship law review is the University of Illinois Law Review; the law school also publishes two specialized law journals, the Elder Law Journal and the Journal of Law, Technology & Policy, which in 2007, ExpressO then ranked as the #4 Science & Technology law journal. The College is also the home institution for the Comparative Labor Law and Policy Journal, and for Law and Philosophy.

The Albert E. Jenner, Jr. Memorial Library is the college's law library. It is among the largest academic law libraries in the United States.

Employment
According to the College of Law's official 2016 ABA-required disclosures, 78.92% of the Class of 2016 obtained full-time, long-term, JD-required employment 10 months after graduation. This was then the 19th highest out of all law schools in the United States. Law School Transparency under-employment score is 10.8%, indicating the percentage of the Class of 2016 unemployed, pursuing an additional degree, or working in a non-professional, short-term, or part-time job 10 months after graduation.

Rankings
In 1957, the Chicago Sunday Tribune released the first modern rankings of law schools, and included Illinois among the top 10 law schools in America. In its annual 2011 ranking of "Go-To Law Schools," The National Law Journal then ranked the University of Illinois College of Law 16th in the number of alumni associates promoted to partner. In the 2010 U.S. News & World Report ranking of American law schools, the college was ranked 21st in the country and in the 2011 ranking, it was ranked 23rd in the country. In the 2012 ranking, the college was originally ranked 23rd in the country.  However, in the wake of the grades and LSAT inflation scandal, that ranking fell from #23 to #35 in 2012, and dropped to 47th in 2013. In the 2014 rankings, the college rose to 40th. In 2015, it dropped one spot to 41st. In 2018, the ranking rose to 37th, and rose again to 31st in the 2020 rankings. The college's 31st place tie with a few other law schools, including Boston College and William & Mary Law School.

In 2012, the National Jurist named the University of Illinois College of Law in its list of the 20 most innovative law schools, based on more than 40 submissions.

In 2020, the popular website Above the Law ranked the college #19 in the nation.

In the 2022 U.S. News & World Report ranking, the college was ranked 29th in the country tied with a few other law schools.

Alumni

Academia
 William Bennett Bizzell 1912 – fifth president of the University of Oklahoma and president of the Agricultural and Mechanical College of Texas (now Texas A&M University)
 Ralph L. Brill – professor of law at Chicago-Kent College of Law and legal writing innovator
 John E. Cribbet 1947 – accomplished legal scholar, dean of the University of Illinois College of Law, and chancellor of the University of Illinois
 Nekima Levy-Pounds 2001 – activist, former president of Minneapolis NAACP and former professor at University of St. Thomas School of Law
 Philip J. McConnaughay 1978 – current dean of Peking University School of Transnational Law and former dean of Pennsylvania State University - Dickinson Law
 Clyde Summers 1942 – labor lawyer and law professor at the Yale Law School and University of Pennsylvania Law School, subject of In re Summers
 William D. Underwood – eighteenth president of Mercer University

Judges

Federal
 Wayne Andersen 1970 – United States federal judge on the United States District Court for the Northern District of Illinois
 Harold Baker 1956 – United States federal judge on the United States District Court for the Central District of Illinois
 Charles Guy Briggle 1904 – United States federal judge on the United States District Court for the Southern District of Illinois
 Colin S. Bruce 1989 – United States federal judge on the United States District Court for the Central District of Illinois
 Owen McIntosh Burns 1929 – United States federal judge on the United States District Court for the Western District of Pennsylvania
 James L. Foreman 1952 – United States federal judge on the United States District Court for the Southern District of Illinois
 James F. Holderman 1971 – United States federal judge on the United States District Court for the Northern District of Illinois
 George Evan Howell 1930 – United States federal judge on the United States Court of Claims
 William F. Jung 1983 – United States federal judge on the United States District Court for the Middle District of Florida
 Frederick J. Kapala 1976 – United States federal judge on the United States District Court for the Northern District of Illinois
 Alfred Younges Kirkland, Sr. 1943 – United States federal judge on the United States District Court for the Northern District of Illinois
 David Laro 1967 – senior judge on the United States Tax Court
 Walter C. Lindley 1910 – United States federal judge on the United States Court of Appeals for the Seventh Circuit
 George Michael Marovich 1954 – United States federal judge on the United States District Court for the Northern District of Illinois
 Prentice Henry Marshall 1967 – United States federal judge on the United States District Court for the Northern District of Illinois
 Frederick Olen Mercer 1924 – United States federal judge on the United States District Court for the Southern District of Illinois
 William A. Moorman 1970 – judge on the United States Court of Appeals for Veterans Claims
 Philip Godfrey Reinhard 1964 – United States federal judge on the United States District Court for the Northern District of Illinois
 Stanley Julian Roszkowski 1954 – United States federal judge on the United States District Court for the Northern District of Illinois
 Fred Louis Wham 1909 – United States federal judge on the United States District Court for the Eastern District of Illinois
 Harlington Wood, Jr. 1948 – United States federal judge on the United States Court of Appeals for the Seventh Circuit

State
 Thomas R. Chiola 1977 – judge of the Illinois Circuit Court of Cook County, first openly gay elected official in Illinois
 Arno H. Denecke 1939 – Chief Justice Oregon Supreme Court
 Byron O. House 1926 – Chief Justice Supreme Court of Illinois
 Lloyd A. Karmeier 1964 – Chief Justice Supreme Court of Illinois
 Ray Klingbiel 1924 – Chief Justice Supreme Court of Illinois
 Howard C. Ryan – Chief Justice Supreme Court of Illinois
 Roy Solfisburg 1940 (LL.B) – Chief Justice Supreme Court of Illinois
 Robert C. Underwood 1939 – Chief Justice Supreme Court of Illinois

Other
 Antonio Herman de Vasconcellos e Benjamin (LL.M) – judge of the Superior Court of Justice of Brazil
 R. Grant Hammond (LL.M) – judge of the New Zealand Court of Appeal

Politics
 Al Salvi 1985 – Illinois House, US Senate candidate, managing partner of Salvi & Maher, LLC
 John Bayard Anderson 1946 – U.S. Congressman and presidential candidate
 William W. Arnold 1901 – U.S. Congressman
 Jason Barickman 2006 – Illinois State Senate
 Terry Lee Bruce 1969 – U.S. Congressman
 John Porter East 1959 – U.S. Senator
 Tom Fink 1952 – Speaker of the Alaska House of Representatives; Mayor of Anchorage
 Otis Ferguson Glenn 1910 – U.S. Senator
 William J. Graham 1893 – U.S. Congressman
 William Perry Holaday 1905 – U.S. Congressman
 George Evan Howell 1930 – U.S. Congressman
 Jesse Jackson, Jr. 1993 – U.S. Congressman
 Tim Johnson 1972 – U.S. Congressman
 B. J. Pak – United States Attorney for the Northern District of Georgia; Member of the Georgia House of Representatives
 Samuel H. Shapiro – Governor of Illinois
 James C. Soper 1931 - Illinois State Senate
 William L. Springer 1935 – U.S. Congressman
 Michael Strautmanis 1994 – Chief Counsel and the Director of Public Liaison and Intergovernmental Affairs on the Barack Obama presidential transition team
 Sheadrick Turner - Illinois House of Representatives
 Harold H. Velde 1937 – U.S. Congressman 
 Samuel H. Young 1947 – U.S. Congressman

Other
 Leonard V. Finder – newspaper editor and publisher
 Michael Fumento (Law) – journalist and author
 Reginald C. Harmon 1927 – First United States Air Force Judge Advocate General
 Albert E. Jenner, Jr. 1930 (LL.B.) – one of the name partners at the law firm of Jenner & Block
 Thomas R. Lamont 1972 – United States Assistant Secretary of the Army (Manpower and Reserve Affairs)
 Paul M. Lisnek 1983 – author, television and radio talk show host and interviewer
 Michael Masser – composer and producer of popular music
 Jerome W. Van Gorkom 1941 – CEO of TransUnion, U.S. Under Secretary of State for Management 1982–83, best known as the named party in the landmark corporate law case of Smith v. Van Gorkom, 488 A.2d 858 (Del. 1985).
 Josh Whitman, 2008 – Athletic director at the University of Illinois, former NFL player

References

External links
 

Law schools in Illinois
Educational institutions established in 1897
1897 establishments in Illinois
Law